Thomas Fig (born 30 March 1977) is a Danish former professional footballer who played as a defender.

Career 

Fig made his debut for Danish club Vejle in the Danish top division if the 1996–97 season with two appearances. He then moved to Padova in the Serie B. In that season, he had 28 appearances and three goals making his debut in the match against Chievo (0–1) on 18 May 1997. In the 1998–99 they suffered relegation to the Serie C1. This season he also suffered a serious ankle injury that would affect the rest of his career. From 1998 to 2006 he jumped between Serie C1 and Serie C2. From 2003 to 2005 he played for Bassano with 29 appearances and 5 goals, before returning to Padova. In the 2006–07 he dropped further down in the divisions into the Serie D with Piovese. In the following year he falls further by joining Monselice. He retired in 2013.

Honours
Padova
 Serie C2: 2000–01

Bassano Virtus
 Serie D: 2004–05

References

1977 births
Living people
Danish men's footballers
Denmark under-21 international footballers
Danish expatriate men's footballers
Danish Superliga players
Serie B players
Vejle Boldklub players
Calcio Padova players
Expatriate footballers in Italy
People from Vejle Municipality
Association football defenders
Bassano Virtus 55 S.T. players
Serie C players
Serie D players
Danish expatriate sportspeople in Italy
Sportspeople from the Region of Southern Denmark